Mamuka Minashvili (born 3 April 1971) is a former Georgian professional footballer.

Club career
He made his professional debut in the Soviet Second League in 1989 for FC Shevardeni Tbilisi. He played for the main FC Dinamo Tbilisi squad in the USSR Federation Cup.

Honours
 Umaglesi Liga runner-up: 1993.

References

1971 births
Footballers from Tbilisi
Living people
Soviet footballers
Footballers from Georgia (country)
Association football forwards
Russian Premier League players
FC Dinamo Tbilisi players
PFC Krylia Sovetov Samara players
FC Sibir Novosibirsk players